ARPACK, the ARnoldi PACKage, is a numerical
software library written in FORTRAN 77 for solving large scale eigenvalue problems
in the matrix-free fashion.

The package is designed to compute a few eigenvalues and corresponding
eigenvectors of large sparse or structured matrices, using the
Implicitly Restarted Arnoldi Method (IRAM)
or, in the case of symmetric matrices, the corresponding variant of the
Lanczos algorithm.
It is used by many popular numerical computing environments such as SciPy, Mathematica, GNU Octave
and MATLAB to provide this functionality.

Reverse Communication Interface 
A powerful matrix-free feature of ARPACK is its ability to use any matrix storage format. This is possible because it doesn't operate on the matrices directly, but instead when a matrix operation is required it returns control to the calling program with a flag indicating what operation is required. The calling program must then perform the operation and call the ARPACK routine again to continue. The operations are typically matrix-vector products, and solving linear systems.

Fork 
Due to stalled upstream development, ARPAСK has been forked into ARPACK-NG, as a form of a collaborative effort of the various groups that rely on ARPACK.

See also

 LOBPCG, a different matrix-free method for symmetric or Hermitian matrices only, implemented in C in BLOPEX, ported to hypre and SLEPc, in C++ in Anasazi (Trilinos), in Python in scipy, in Julia language, MATLAB, GNU Octave, as well as in Matrix Algebra on GPU and Multicore Architectures (MAGMA) and NVIDIA CUDA.
 LAPACK, software library based on matrix transformations for dense matrices.

References

External links
  at Rice University
 arpack-ng fork, joint effort between Scilab, GNU Octave, Debian, and others.

Fortran libraries
Free software programmed in Fortran
Numerical software
Software using the BSD license